The Lesotho Mounted Police Service (LMPS) is the national police force of the Southern African Kingdom of Lesotho.

History
The police service was established in 1872, with an initial strength of 110 men. It adopted military discipline and, from 1878, military rank structure based on the British army. In the 1950s the force moved towards a civilian police operation, and in 1958 replaced its military rank structure with conventional civilian police ranks. Originally known as the Basutoland Mounted Police, the force later changed its name to Lesotho Police, then Lesotho Mounted Police (1966), and Royal Lesotho Mounted Force (1986). Today, in common with many police forces, it has adopted the style "police service" in its current formal name of Lesotho Mounted Police Service.

Ranks

Training
The national Police Training College (P.T.C) opened in 1946. All recruits are enrolled as Cadets and complete a thirteen-month training course. Recruits must be aged between 18 and 30, and pass an initial entrance examination. Recruits are accepted from all parts of Lesotho society, but must be registered as Lesotho citizens. Although police positions were originally restricted to men only, the force has admitted women officers since 1970.

See also
 Lesotho Defence Force

References

Law enforcement in Lesotho
Crime in Lesotho
1998 establishments in Lesotho